The Netherlands competed at the 2014 Winter Olympics in Sochi, Russia from 7 to 23 February 2014. The Dutch team was the largest Dutch delegation at a Winter Olympics, with 41 competitors that participated in bobsleigh, short track speed skating, snowboarding, and speed skating.

With a total of 24 medals, it turned out to be the most successful Winter Games ever for the Dutch team. The Dutch team won 23 medals in speed skating and one medal in short track speed skating. Olympic speed skating records were set on the men's 5,000 metres by Sven Kramer, the men's 10,000 metres by Jorrit Bergsma, the men's team pursuit by Jan Blokhuijsen, Sven Kramer and Koen Verweij, the women's 1,500 metres by Jorien ter Mors and the women's team pursuit by Marrit Leenstra, Jorien ter Mors and Ireen Wüst. By sweeping the podium in speed skating at the men's 500 m, 5,000 metres and 10,000 metres, and the women's 1,500 m, the Netherlands became the first country in Winter Olympics history to achieve four podium sweeps at one edition of the Games.

King Willem-Alexander, Queen Máxima, Prime Minister Mark Rutte, and Minister of Health, Welfare, and Sport Edith Schippers attended the Olympics. The Holland Heineken House was the meeting place for supporters and athletes during the Olympics.

Medalists 
The Dutch team won 24 medals of which 23 were in (long track) speed skating and one in short track speed skating.

The speed skaters swept the podiums in the men's 500 metres, men's 5,000 metres, men's 10,000 metres, and the women's 1,500 metres. The Netherlands is the first country to achieve four podium sweeps at one Winter Olympics edition (beating the previous record of two which was achieved by Norway in 1924, 1928 and 1932, Soviet Union in 1964, East Germany in 1972 and 1984 and Germany in 1998).

In the women's 1,500 metres speed skating, Dutch athletes placed 1st, 2nd, 3rd and 4th; the first such result in Olympic speed skating history by athletes from a single nation.

| width="78%" align="left" valign="top" |

| width="22%" align="left" valign="top" |

Team 

The Dutch team consisted of 41 competitors that participated in bobsleigh (6), short track speed skating (10), snowboarding (6), and speed skating (20). It was the largest Dutch delegation ever at the Winter Olympics. It was also the first time that the Netherlands had an athlete competing in two different sports: Jorien ter Mors competed in both short track speed skating and speed skating. Jorien ter Mors was the Dutch flag bearer at the opening ceremony and Bob de Jong was the flag bearer at the closing ceremony. Maurits Hendriks was the chef de mission for the Dutch team.

Sports

Bobsleigh 

The Dutch bobsledders (6 athletes) competed with one team in each bobsleigh event: two-man, four-man, and two-woman. Their best result was a fourth place of the two-woman team.

Key: * denotes pilot of each sled, = denotes multiple teams share the same rank. Source:

Short track speed skating 

The Dutch short track speed skaters (10 athletes) competed in all eight short track events.

The Netherlands qualified the maximum of five skaters of each gender for the Olympics during World Cup 3 & 4 in November 2013. Four men qualified for the 500 metres, but only three were allowed to start. The selection committee of the Dutch Speed Skating Federation (KNSB) decided that Daan Breeuwsma would not compete in the 500 metres.

Sjinkie Knegt won the bronze medal in the men's 1000 metres, which is the first ever Olympic medal in short track speed skating for the Netherlands.

Men

Christiaan Bokkerink was selected as part of the relay squad but did not compete during the event.
Key: AA = Advanced to medal round due to being impeded by another skater; DNA = Did not advance; FA = Qualify to medal round; FB = Qualify to consolation round; PEN = Penalty; Q = Qualified to next round. Source:

Women

Rianne de Vries was selected as part of the relay squad but did not compete during the event.
Key: A = Advanced to next round due to being impeded by another skater; DNA = Did not advance; FA = Qualify to medal round; FB = Qualify to consolation round; PEN = Penalty; Q = Qualified to next round. Source:

Snowboarding 

The Dutch snowboarders (6 athletes) competed in five of ten snowboarding events: men's halfpipe (2), women's slopestyle (1), women's parallel giant slalom (2), women's parallel slalom (2), and women's snowboard cross (1). None of the competitors advanced to the finals of their disciplines.

Freestyle

Key: QS = Qualify to semifinal. Source:

Parallel

Key: L = Lost, Q = Qualify to next round. Source:

Snowboard cross

Source:

Speed skating 

The Netherlands qualified the maximum of ten speed skaters of each gender. Individual riders were selected from the results of the Dutch Olympic Qualification Tournament, held between 27 and 30 December 2013 in Thialf, Heerenveen.

The Dutch speed skaters competed in all twelve long track events. The Netherlands dominated in speed skating, winning eight out of the 12 gold medals and a total of 23 out of 36 medals (of which any team, of course, could win a maximum of 32), with medals in all events. There were four Dutch podium sweeps at the men's 5000 m, men's 500 m, women's 1500 m and men's 10000 m. The women's 1,500 metres resulted in the Dutch women placing 1st, 2nd, 3rd, and 4th; the first such result by a single nation since East Germany dominated the men's singles luge competition at the 1972 Winter Olympics.

Margot Boer, by winning the bronze medal in the women's 500 metres, won the first ever Dutch Olympic medal in that event, while Michel Mulder was the first Dutch man to win gold at the 500 metres.

Men

Key:  = Olympic record. Source:

Women

Key:  = Olympic record. Source:

Team pursuit

Jorrit Bergsma was selected as part of the men's team pursuit squad but did not compete during the event.
Key:  = Olympic record, W = Won. Source:

Supporters

Dignitaries 
Dutch Prime Minister Mark Rutte and King Willem-Alexander attended the Olympics, despite the recent troubled Dutch relationship with Russia. The pair was accompanied by the King's wife Queen Máxima and Dutch Minister of Health, Welfare and Sport Edith Schippers, with the King's status as an Honorary member of the IOC adding to the significance of his visit. The visit was controversial due to the Russian anti-gay laws. On the second day of the Games, King Willem-Alexander awarded the medals to the three Dutch medalists of the men's 5000 metres speed skating during the victory ceremony at medal plaza.

National house 
During the Games, the Netherlands had a national house; the 12th edition of the Holland Heineken House. Organized by NOC*NSF and Heineken, the Dutch national house was a meeting place for Dutch supporters, athletes and other followers. The Dutch national house was located 5 km south of the Olympic Park at the Azimut Hotel Resort. King Willem-Alexander and Queen Máxima, as well as Russian president Vladimir Putin visited the Dutch national house during the Games.

References

External links 

Netherlands Team at Sochi 2014 Olympics

Nations at the 2014 Winter Olympics
2014
Winter Olympics